Heaven's End is the debut album by British alternative rock band Loop. It was released in 1987 by Head Records and peaked at #4 in the UK Indie Charts.

Track listing

Charts

References

1987 debut albums
Loop (band) albums